William Mudie may refer to:
 William Mudie (cricketer), English cricketer
 William Henry Mudie, Anglican priest and educator in Adelaide, South Australia
 William Moodie, or Mudie, Scottish minister